Tom Taylor (born Henry Thomas Taylor; July 7, 1911 — July 20, 1970) was a Welsh cricketer. He was a right-handed batsman who played first-class cricket for Glamorgan. He was born in Cardiff and died in Pontypridd.

Having played club cricket with St. Fagans during the 1930s, Taylor played three first-class matches for Glamorgan between 1932 and 1934, though he had little success with the bat - sixteen of his seventeen first-class runs coming in a single innings. Between 1935 and 1950 Taylor played in at least six Minor Counties Championship matches for Glamorgan's Second XI - and during this decade he also took charge of four matches as umpire.

External links
Tom Taylor at Cricket Archive 

1911 births
1970 deaths
Welsh cricketers
Glamorgan cricketers